Live in Hawaii may refer to:

Live in Hawaii, a Jimmy Buffett sound board live album
Live in Hawaii (Janet Jackson DVD)